The Edward River Council is a local government area in the Riverina region of New South Wales, Australia. This area was formed in 2016 from the merger of the Deniliquin Council with the surrounding Conargo Shire.

The combined area covers the urban area of Deniliquin and the surrounding region to the north and west across the pastoral southern Riverina plains.

The inaugural Mayor of the Edward River Council is Norm Brennan, elected by the Councillors on 20 September 2017.

Main towns and villages

In addition to the main centre of Deniliquin, localities in the area include Blighty, Booroorban, Conargo, Mayrung, Morago, Pretty Pine and Wanganella.

Demographics

Council
Edward River Council has nine Councillors elected proportionally as a single ward. All Councillors are elected for a fixed four-year term of office.

The most recent election was held on 9 September 2017, and the makeup of the council is as follows:

See also

 Local government areas of New South Wales
 Edward River Council Website

References

 
Local government areas of the Riverina
2016 establishments in Australia